The Kaohsiung Japanese School is a Japanese international school on the campus of Kaohsiung Municipal Lingya District Jhong-Jheng Elementary School (高雄市苓雅區中正國民小學) in Lingya District, Kaohsiung, Taiwan in the Republic of China.

It was previously located in Sanmin District. The enrollment declined significantly between 1990 and 2010. The final day of class in the former Sanmin campus was on 19 July 2014.

See also
 Japanese people in China
Republic of China-aligned Chinese international schools in Japan:
 Osaka Chinese School
 Tokyo Chinese School
 Yokohama Overseas Chinese School

References
  Dohi, Yutaka (土肥 豊; Osaka University of Comprehensive Children Education). "The Present Situation and the Problems of the Japanese Schools in Taiwan" (台湾の日本人学校の現状と課題 ; Archive). Journal of Osaka University of Comprehensive Children Education (大阪総合保育大学紀要) (5), 153–172, 2011-03-20. Osaka University of Comprehensive Children Education. See profile at CiNii. English abstract available. Available from the Osaka University of Comprehensive Children Education Library.
Japanese:
 池崎 八生(大分大学教育福祉科学部情報教育コース) 与 池崎 喜美恵 (東京学芸大学教育学部生活科学学科). 日本人学校における技術・家庭科教育および情報教育の現状(第2報) : 台湾在住の児童・生徒を対象に ("Actual Condition of Industrial arts and Home Economics, Information Education in Japanese School (2nd report) : Students in Taiwan" ). 大分大学教育福祉科学部研究紀要 (The Research Bulletin of the Faculty of Education and Welfare Science, Oita University). 26(1), 151–165, 2004–04. 大分大学. 
 斉藤 博文; 前高雄日本人学校教諭・新潟県小千谷市立東小千谷中学校教諭). "海外校における国際理解学習の特性 : 高雄日本人学校の総合的な学習の考え方・現地理解学習を通した国際理解学習のあり方." 在外教育施設における指導実践記録 24, 72–75, 2001. 東京学芸大学.

Notes

Further reading

 Ikezaki, Yatsuo (池崎 八生; Oita University教育福祉科学部情報教育コース) and Kimie Ikezaki (池崎 喜美恵 Ikezaki Kimie; Tokyo Gakugei University教育学部生活科学学科). "Actual Condition of Industrial arts and Home Economics, Information Education in Japanese School (2nd report) : Students in Taiwan" (日本人学校における技術・家庭科教育および情報教育の現状(第2報) : 台湾在住の児童・生徒を対象に). The Research Bulletin of the Faculty of Education and Welfare Science, Oita University (大分大学教育福祉科学部研究紀要). 26(1), 151–165, 2004–04. Oita University. See profile at CiNii.
 Saitou, Hirofumi (斉藤 博文 Saitō Hirofumi; 前高雄日本人学校教諭・新潟県小千谷市立東小千谷中学校教諭). "海外校における国際理解学習の特性 : 高雄日本人学校の総合的な学習の考え方・現地理解学習を通した国際理解学習のあり方." 在外教育施設における指導実践記録 24, 72–75, 2001. Tokyo Gakugei University. See profile at CiNii.

External links

  Kaohsiung Japanese School
  Kaohsiung Japanese School - (Archive) website, mid-to-late 2000s
  Kaohsiung Japanese School - (Archive) website, late 1990s to early 2000s
 English page

1969 establishments in Taiwan
Educational institutions established in 1969
International schools in Kaohsiung
Japanese international schools in Taiwan
Lingya District
Kaohsiung